John Albert "Tommy" Tomlin (August 17, 1894 – March 23, 1949) was an American football player. He played professionally as guard and tackle for the Akron Pros, Hammond Pros, Milwaukee Badgers and New York Giants of the National Football League (NFL). He was born to Elizabeth Ford (1859–1927) and George Tomlin (1854–1928). Tomlin won an NFL title in 1920 with Akron.

References

External links
 

1894 births
1949 deaths
American football guards
American football tackles
Akron Pros players
Hammond Pros players
Milwaukee Badgers players
New York Giants players
Syracuse Orange football players
Sportspeople from Waltham, Massachusetts
Players of American football from Massachusetts